Madina is a village and rural commune in the Cercle of Kita in the Kayes Region of southwestern Mali. The commune contains 12 villages and in the 2009 census had a population of 9,808.

References

External links
.

Communes of Kayes Region